St Andrew, with the address of 1 High Street, is a 19th-century residential building in Llandaff, Cardiff, Wales. The building is a two-storey Grade II listed structure and it was listed because it is "Included as an unaltered design by Ewan Christian and for its group value with the other listed buildings around the Cathedral Green and on the High Street". The garden wall of St Andrew is also a Grade II structure.

History

The building was built between 1859 and 1861 by Ewan Christian, who was the architect for the Ecclesiastical Commissioners. It is a left-hand house with its neighbour being St Cross. Both semi-detached houses were built for minor canons of Llandaff Cathedral. It was built with multi-coloured stones, both square or rectangular in shape, and with Bath stone, ashlar dressings and Welsh slate roof. The buildings match Cathedral Court on the other side of the cathedral green, which Christian designed as the deanery. John Newman, in his Glamorgan volume of the Pevsner Buildings of Wales series, notes St Andrew's “engaging corbelled chimneystacks”.

It was later occupied by Sir Tasker Watkins VC and his family. On 16 August 2019, a Blue Plaque was be unveiled on the building to commemorate Sir Tasker Watkins' association with Llandaff, and the house that he lived in between 1945-55.  

In October 2022, the house was put up for sale for £1 million by the representative body of the Church in Wales.

Garden wall of St Andrew

References

External links
 

Ewan Christian buildings
Grade II listed buildings in Cardiff
High Street, Llandaff